Fusarium acaciae is an anamorph fungus species of the genus Fusarium.

References

acaciae
Fungi described in 1891